Released in 1975, Feel Like Makin' Love is Roberta Flack's fifth solo album and sixth overall, when counting her duet album with Donny Hathaway, Roberta Flack & Donny Hathaway from 1972. It was the first album produced by Flack herself, under the pseudonym Rubina Flake.

The album's title cut had been issued as a single in June 1974 affording Flack her third #1 hit on the Billboard Hot 100, after which success Atlantic Records signed Flack to a new five year contract - reportedly the most lucrative ever signed by a female recording artist. The Feel Like Makin' Love album had reportedly by September 1974 already accrued enough advance orders from retail outlets to guarantee gold status upon the album's release, which was expected in November 1974.

In fact, the album would not be ready for release until March 1975 having taken fourteen months to record. Although Flack had self-produced the "Feel Like Makin' Love" single, she had begun recording the album with her regular producer Joel Dorn: unhappy when Flack recruited "Feel Like Makin' Love" co-writer Gene McDaniels as an additional producer, Dorn had withdrawn from Flack's album (Dorn would, in fact, end his seven-year association with Atlantic Records) and after Flack and McDaniels proved unable to establish an agreeable working relationship Flack was left to produce her album alone.

Although Flack had worked closely with Joel Dorn in the recording of her previous albums the singer found the task of producing an entire album by herself an arduous challenge: (Roberta Flack quote:)"I made a lot of mistakes. It was a very hard time for me. There were days when I just cried and cried. But you press on. You press on." Upon the belated release of the Feel Like Makin' Love album Flack admitted that Atlantic Records were discontented with the time and expense spent on the album: (Roberta Flack quote:)"the [high price tag] is misleading. Some material I recorded will be used on my next two albums [which] I will be able to finish...very quickly and [cost efficiently]" - in fact Flack's next album: Blue Lights in the Basement, would not be ready for release until December 1977 - thirty-three months after the release of the Feel Like Makin' Love album. Despite its reported heavy advance orders, Feel Like Makin' Love would become Flack's first album to not be certified gold.

Track listing

Personnel 
 Roberta Flack – lead and backing vocals, keyboards, arrangements (3, 5)
 Bob James – keyboards
 Leon Pendarvis – keyboards, arrangements (1, 5, 7, 8)
 Richard Tee – keyboards
 Harry Whitaker – keyboards, arrangements (3)
 Keith Loving – acoustic guitar, electric guitar
 Hugh McCracken – acoustic guitar, electric guitar
 David Spinozza – acoustic guitar, electric guitar
 Richie Resnicoff – acoustic guitar, electric guitar
 Stuart Scharf – fretted instruments, arrangements (4, 9)
 Anthony Jackson – electric bass 
 Gary King – electric bass
 Alphonse Mouzon – drums 
 Idris Muhammad – drums
 Ronnie Zito – drums
 David Carey – percussion, vibraphone
 Ralph MacDonald – congas, percussion, arrangements (2, 6)
 Phil Kraus – percussion, timpani
 Arthur Jenkins – kalimba, arrangements (2)
 James Vass – flute 
 Joe Farrell – oboe 
 Karen Sargent – oboe
 Jo Armstead – backing vocals 
 Patti Austin – backing vocals 
 Betty Buckley – backing vocals 
 Bob Dorough – backing vocals 
 William Eaton – backing vocals, arrangements (2)
 Janice Gadson – backing vocals 
 Lani Groves – backing vocals 
 Rhetta Hughes – backing vocals 
 Lesley Miller – backing vocals 
 William Salter – backing vocals, arrangements (2, 6)
 Maeretha Stewart – backing vocals 
 Deniece Williams – backing vocals

Production 
 Roberta Flack – producer, album design 
 Leon Pendarvis – associate producer 
 Gene McDaniels – co-producer 
 Antisia Music, Inc. – co-producers
 Scharf / Dorough, Ltd. – co-producers
 Frederick Wilkerson – vocal production
 Louise Fleming – production assistant 
 Jim McCurdy – engineer, remixing
 Stephen Y. Scheaffer – engineer
 John Struthers – assistant engineer
 Harry Yamick – engineer
 Lou Stovall – album design, cover artwork

References

Roberta Flack albums
1975 albums
Albums produced by Joel Dorn
Atlantic Records albums